Hektor Giotopoulos Moore is an Australian pair skater. With his skating partner, Anastasia Golubeva, he is the 2022 CS Warsaw Cup champion. 

On the junior level, Golubeva/Giotopoulos Moore are a two-time World silver medalist (2022 and 2023) and the 2022-23 Junior Grand Prix Final champions.

Programs

With Golubeva

Competitive highlights 
CS: Challenger Series; JGP: Junior Grand Prix

With Golubeva

References

External links 
 

2002 births
Living people
Australian male pair skaters
Sportspeople from Melbourne
World Junior Figure Skating Championships medalists